Nathan W. Biah Sr. (born December 14, 1971) is an American politician and educator who serves in the Rhode Island House of Representatives for the 3rd district.

Early life
Born and raised in Monrovia, the capital of Liberia, Biah was his parents' only child. Biah was sent to a preparatory school considered one of the "most prestigious" in Liberia, but his education was interrupted by the First Liberian Civil War, which caused Biah to emigrate to the United States.

Political career
Biah announced a primary challenge to incumbent representative Moira Walsh in 2020. Walsh, a staunch progressive, had been an opponent of Speaker of the Rhode Island House Nicholas Mattiello, who thus supported Biah. Biah was also endorsed by Rhode Island Right to Life, an anti-abortion organization. In contrast to most other successful primaries in the 2020 Rhode Island House elections, where progressives had ousted allies of Mattiello, Biah defeated Walsh 64–35, and was unopposed in the general election.

References

American politicians of Liberian descent
Democratic Party members of the Rhode Island House of Representatives
Living people
1971 births
Rhode Island College alumni
21st-century American politicians
Liberian emigrants to the United States
Politicians from Monrovia
African-American state legislators in Rhode Island